The Inamori Foundation is a private foundation known for its annual announcement of the Kyoto Prize, founded by Kazuo Inamori in 1984. It reflects "the lifelong beliefs of its founder that people have no higher calling than to strive for the greater good of humankind and society and that the future of humanity can be assured only when there is a balance between scientific development and the enrichment of the human spirit." It has an endowment of 114.5 billion yen as of March 31, 2019. The honorary president of the foundation is Princess Takamado.

Research grants
In addition to awarding the Kyoto Prize, the foundation is also responsible for giving out research grants and fellowships.

See also 
 Kyoto Prize

References

External links 
 Inamori Foundation
 Inamori Ethics Prize

Foundations based in Japan
1984 establishments in Japan
Organizations established in 1984
Organizations based in Kyoto Prefecture